Essery is a surname. Notable people with the surname include:

 Bob Essery (1930–2021), British railway modeller and historian
 Emanuel Essery (1843–1937), Canadian lawyer and politician

See also
 Esser